Tyrone Benskin (born 29 December 1958) is an English-Canadian actor, theatre director and politician. He was elected Member of Parliament in the Jeanne-Le Ber riding, in Montreal, Quebec, in the 2011 Canadian federal election and served as an MP until 2015.

Life and career
Benskin was born in Bristol, England but moved to Canada in 1968 at age nine.

Artistic career
Having studied theatre at both CEGEP and university levels in Montreal, Benskin has become a significant presence in theatre, film, television and music. His theatre credits include features appearances on such celebrated stages as the Stratford Shakespeare Festival, the National Arts Centre and the Centaur Theatre in Montreal.

Benskin also supplied the voice of Kobalt in the 1996 animated series of Flash Gordon and Bo and Wimzie's father Rousso in the children's television series Wimzie's House.

In politics
On 30 January 2011, Benskin was announced as the federal New Democratic Party candidate in the Montreal-area riding of Jeanne-Le Ber in the 2011 federal election. During the election, his candidacy was seen as one of the NDP's better chances for a gain in Quebec, and NDP leader Jack Layton described him as having minister potential. On 2 May 2011, he was elected to the House of Commons of Canada with a substantial margin, defeating Bloc Québécois incumbent Thierry St-Cyr.

Benskin was named the Official Opposition's critic for Canadian Heritage, and later transferred to the Official Languages file as deputy critic. He was dropped from the shadow cabinet after party leader Thomas Mulcair learned that Benskin owed the Quebec revenue agency $58,000 for unpaid taxes from 2007 to 2011. Benskin apologized, attributing the non-payment to having precarious employment as an artist prior to becoming an MP. Benskin did not stand as a candidate in the 2015 federal election, having lost the local party's nomination to Allison Turner.

Electoral record

Filmography

Film

 Killing 'em Softly (1982) as 2nd Black man
 Adam's Wall as Mostafa
 Aftermath (2002) as Arnold Ross
 The Amityville Curse (1990) as Video Technician
 Bears as Narrator
 Blind Fear as Guard
 Canvas (1992) as Detective Austin
 Cargo (2000) as Radio
 Criminal Law as Jackson
 Dead Like Me: Life After Death as Police Commissioner Cusek
 Death of a Ladies' Man as Jonathan Hébert
 Enemies: A Love Story as Cabbie
 Fais danser la poussière as Lawyer
 Full Disclosure (2001) as FBI Special Agent Draper
 I'm Not There (2007) as Mr. Avrin
 Island of the Dead (2000) as Dwight Truman
 Jack Paradise: Montreal by Night (Jack Paradise : Les nuits de Montréal) as Winston White
 The Kiss (1988) as Railway Station Doctor
 Lotto 6/66 (2006, Short) as Landlord
 Money (1991) as 3rd Broker
 Relative Fear (1994) as Cop
 The Killing Machine (1994) as Doctor #2
 Soul Survivor (1995) as Jerome
 The Wrong Woman (1995) as Mitchum
 Marked Man (1996) as Detective Boyd
 Sci-fighters (1996) as Dr. Gene Washington
 Stranger in the House (1997) as Slovitz
 Peepers as Helman
 Scanners II: The New Order as Store Owner
 Stolen Babies, Stolen Lives as Narrator
 Sunday Afternoon as Monty
 Volcanos of the Deep Sea as Narrator
 10.5: Apocalypse as Jackson, The Bartender
 300 (2006) as Persian Emissary

Television

 Night Heat (1988) as Mitch Malloy
 Shades of Love: The Man Who Guards the Greenhouse (1988, TV Movie) as Workman
 The Phone Call (1989, TV Movie) as Police Officer #2
 The Final Heist (1991, TV Movie) as Juan
 Urban Angel (1991) as Agent #1 / Travis
 The Boys of St. Vincent (1994, TV Movie) as Dr. Maynard
 Race to Freedom: The Underground Railroad (1994, TV Movie) as Ward
 TekWar: TekLords (1994, TV Movie) as Dr. Brimell
 My Breast (1994, TV Movie) as Dr. Henry Balmer
 Ready or Not (1994) as Mr. Edwards
 Forever Knight (1995) as Jonah
 Convict Cowboy (1995, TV Movie) as Curtis
 Cagney and Lacey: The View Through the Glass Ceiling (1995, TV Movie) as Dr. Nasser
 Side Effects (1995) as Detective Watson
 Spenser: A Savage Place (1995, TV Movie) as Stevenson
 Johnny and Clyde (1995, TV Movie) as Hadley
 Dark Eyes (1995) as Bill Marsden
 Due South (1995-1998) as Mr. Shawl / Jeff Storey
 Wimzie's House (1995-2002) as Rousso (voice)
 Are You Afraid of the Dark? (1996) as Jack Palmer
 A Husband, a Wife and a Lover (1996, TV Movie) as Dr. Carpenter
 F/X: The Series (1996) as Judge
 We the Jury (1996, TV Movie) as Noland James
 Riverdale (1997) as Mike
 A Taste of Shakespeare (1997) as Prince of Morocco / Tubal / Duke of Venice
 Earth: Final Conflict (1998) as Frank Rice
 The Long Island Incident (1998, TV Movie) as Colin Ferguson
 Thanks of a Grateful Nation (1998, TV Movie) as Superintendent Meeker
 Naked City: Justice with a Bullet (1998, TV Movie) as Donovan
 Live Through This (2000) as 'Sparky'
 Big Wolf on Campus (2000) as Male Nurse St. Jacques
 Radio Active (2001) as Coach Hadress
 The Killing Yard (2001, TV Movie) as Haywood Burns
 Tales from the Neverending Story (2001) as Cairon
 Largo Winch (2001-2002) as Waldo Buzetti
 Redeemer (2002, TV Movie)
 Obsessed (2002, TV Movie) as Judge Tyrone Wolf
 Deacons for Defense (2003, TV Movie) as Archie
 The Newsroom (2003) as Mr. Taylor
 The Wool Cap (2004, TV Movie) as Clarence
 Naked Josh (2004) as Tyrone Charpentier
 15/Love (2005) as Mr. White
 Mind Over Murder (2005, TV Movie) as Julian Hasty
 Charlie Jade (2005) as Karl Lubinsky
 Proof of Lies (2006, TV Movie) as Robert Hunter
 The Rival (2006, TV Movie) as Detective Martin
 Superstorm (2007) as Murray Michaels
 Durham County (2007) as Ranjit
 Christie's Revenge (2007, TV Movie) as Detective Hogue
 The Dead Zone (2007) as Orderley Dewey Morris
 The Love of Her Life (2008, TV Movie) as Officer Kingman
 Sophie (2008) as Mr. Byrd
 The Christmas Choir (2008, TV Movie) as Bob
 Final Verdict (2009, TV Movie) as Detective Lewis
 My Nanny's Secret (2009, TV Movie) as Detective Drabant
 Jupiter's Legacy (2021) as Willie Small
 Debris (2021) as George Jones
 Dan Brown's The Lost Symbol (2021) as Warren Bellamy

Animation

 Ace Ventura: Pet Detective – Additional Voices
 Anatole
 Animal Crackers
 Bad Dog – Judge Bigly
 Belphegor – Additional Voices
 Birdz – Additional Voices
 Diabolik
 Dog's World
 Dragon Hunters
 Flash Gordon – Kobalt
 Flight Squad
 Freaky Stories
 Ivanhoe
 Jim Button – Additional Voices
 Kassai and Leuk – Additional Voices
 Malo Korrigan – Additional Voices
 Manivald - Moose
 A Miss Mallard Mystery – Additional Voices
 Patrol 03 (1997)
 The Country Mouse and the City Mouse Adventures (1997-1999) (uncredited)
 Mythic Warriors: Guardians of the Legend (1998-1999) as Elpenor
 Tripping the Rift (2004)
 The Legend of Sarila (2003) as Itak (English version)
 Ned's Newt
 The Neverending Story
 Ocean Tales
 Pet Pals
 Pig City
 Princess Sissi – Joseph, Dania
 Rescue Heroes – Additional Voices
 Ripley's Believe It or Not! – Roger Glapion
 Silver Surfer
 Superplants – Narrator
 The Tofus – Additional Voices
 X-Chromosome – Additional Voices
 X-DuckX – Additional Voices

Video games
 Jagged Alliance (1994)
 Jagged Alliance: Deadly Games (1996)
 Jagged Alliance 2 (1999)
 Wizardry 8 (2001)
 Evolution Worlds (2002) as Federico / Infantryman #4
 Rainbow Six: Vegas (2006)
 Far Cry 2 (2008)
 Splinter Cell (2010) as Lucias Gaillard
 Splinter Cell: Conviction (2010) as Lucious Galliard

References

External links

1958 births
English emigrants to Canada
English male television actors
English male film actors
English male voice actors
English male stage actors
Canadian male television actors
Canadian male film actors
Canadian male voice actors
Canadian male stage actors
Black British male actors
Black Canadian male actors
Male actors from Bristol
Male actors from Montreal
New Democratic Party MPs
Politicians from Montreal
Canadian actor-politicians
Members of the House of Commons of Canada from Quebec
Black Canadian politicians
Anglophone Quebec people
People from Le Sud-Ouest
Living people
Canadian people of African-American descent
21st-century Canadian politicians
Canadian artistic directors